Warud Orange City railway station is a small railway station in Amravati district, Maharashtra. Its code is WOC. It serves Warud Town. The station consists of one platform. The platform is not well sheltered. It lacks many facilities including water and sanitation.

Waruds railway station has given the name "Warud Orange City" because it is the biggest exporter of oranges in India.

Trains 

Kacheguda–Narkhed Intercity Express
Narkhed–Kacheguda Intercity Express
New Amravati–Narkhed Passenger
Narkher–New Amravati Passenger
Bhusaval–Narkher Fast Passenger (via New Amravati)
Narkher–Bhusaval Fast Passenger (via New Amravati)
Yeswantpur–Indore Superfast Express
Indore–Yeswantpur Superfast Express

References 

Nagpur CR railway division
Railway stations in Amravati district